Billington is a surname. Notable people with the surname include:

Adeline Billington (1826–1917), English actress and teacher

Billington family
James Billington (1847 – 1901), English executioner
Thomas Billington (1872 – 1902), English executioner
William Billington (1875 – 1952), English executioner
John Billington (1880 – 1905), English executioner
Tom Billington (1958–2018), English professional wrestler best known as Dynamite Kid
Clyde Billington Jr. (1934-2018), American businessman, chemist, and politician
Craig Billington (born 1966), retired Canadian ice hockey goaltender
Elizabeth Billington (1765–1818), British opera singer
Francelia Billington (1895–1934), American actress
Fred Billington (1862–1917), English singer and actor
Geoff Billington, British showjumper 
James H. Billington (1929-2018), United States Librarian of Congress
John Billington (1580s–1630), an immigrant on the Mayflower and first Englishman to be hanged in New England
John Billington (actor) (1830–1904), English actor
Joseph Billington, English footballer
Kevin Billington (1934-2021), British film director
Michael Billington (actor) (1941–2005), the popular British film and television actor
Michael Billington (critic) (born 1939), the drama critic of The Guardian
Michael Billington (activist), activist in the LaRouche movement, author of Reflections of an American Political Prisoner
Polly  Billington, radio reporter
Rachel Billington (born 1942), British author
Ray Allen Billington (1903–1981), American historian
Teresa Billington-Greig (1877–1964), suffragette and one of 70 founders of the Women's Freedom League
Teddy Billington (1882–1966), US Olympic cyclist
William Billington (poet) (1825–1884), English poet

See also
Thomas Billington (disambiguation)
Billinton